Rozewie Lighthouse (Polish: Latarnia Morska Rozewie) is a lighthouse in the small village of Rozewie, located between Jastrzębia Góra and Władysławowo, on the Polish coast of the Baltic Sea.

The lighthouse is located in between the lighthouse in Stilo and Jastarnia Lighthouse. The lighthouse has the largest focal length among Polish lighthouses.

History 

The lighthouse was built in 1822 after a year of construction. Initially, the light source was a rapeseed oil fired lamp – located in the lantern room on the top level of the lighthouse; but this was replaced in 1866 by the Fresnel apparatus, also oil-fired. Ten years later the light glare was finally replaced by a kerosene lamp.

This lighthouse is linked with a legend created by Leon Wzorek – an elderly lighthouse keeper, Stefan Zeromski who wrote his novel The Wind from the Sea during his time at the lighthouse. The lighthouse is made up of two parts, the first is built from brick and resembles a broad, truncated cone, and the second, standing on top of the brick base, is made from a steel tube. Of the three observation galleries only the lowest is open to the public; while the highest one – in the signal room can be accessed as an observation deck from which you can locate Władysławowo (to the east) and Jastrzębia Góra (to the west).

Currently, the light glare is an optical system made up of 20 reflector bulbs, 10 on each rotating panel. The tower has a height of 33 metres, with a focal length of 83.2 metres and a range of 26.0 nautical miles. The attraction here is the Lighthouse Museum. Exhibits include a presentation about the evolution of lighthouses from ancient times until today, models of lighthouses and their locations, and a rotating table with a Fresnel lens; nearby the site, is the new lighthouse – which is currently deactivated.

Technical data 
 Light characteristic
 Light: 0.1 s.
 Darkness: 2.9 s.
 Period: 3 s.

See also 

 List of lighthouses in Poland

References

External links 

 Urząd Morski w Słupsku  
 Rozewie Lighthouse - Latarnia morska (Rozewie) stara na portalu polska-org.pl  

Lighthouses completed in 1822
Resort architecture in Pomerania
Lighthouses in Poland
Tourist attractions in Pomeranian Voivodeship
1822 establishments in Prussia